Héctor José Moreno Moreno (born June 8, 1963 in Ventaquemada, Boyacá) is a retired Colombian racewalker. He went to four Olympic Games and five World Championships in Athletics. He is one of the most successful Colombian athletes of the past fifty years because only one other Colombian also has a Pan American Games title. Another highlight is the permanence of his personal best of 3:52:16 hours (set in 1997) as the national record for more than twelve years.

At regional level he was a two-time champion at the South American Championships in Athletics (1983 and 1997), the gold medallist at the 1998 South American Games, the 1990 Central American and Caribbean Games champion, and the 1989 Bolivarian Games winner. He has also won several lesser medals internationally, including two bronzes at the Pan American Games, two silvers at the South American Championships, three silvers at the Bolivarian Games and two bronzes at the Ibero-American Championships in Athletics.

His long international career stretched from 1981 to 1999.

Personal bests
20 km walk: 1:21:50 hrs – New York City, 3 May 1987
50 km walk: 3:52:16 hrs – Naumburg, 25 May 1997

Achievements

References

1963 births
Living people
Colombian male racewalkers
Olympic athletes of Colombia
Athletes (track and field) at the 1984 Summer Olympics
Athletes (track and field) at the 1988 Summer Olympics
Athletes (track and field) at the 1992 Summer Olympics
Athletes (track and field) at the 1996 Summer Olympics
Pan American Games medalists in athletics (track and field)
Pan American Games gold medalists for Colombia
Pan American Games bronze medalists for Colombia
Athletes (track and field) at the 1983 Pan American Games
Athletes (track and field) at the 1987 Pan American Games
Athletes (track and field) at the 1991 Pan American Games
Athletes (track and field) at the 1995 Pan American Games
Athletes (track and field) at the 1999 Pan American Games
World Athletics Championships athletes for Colombia
Sportspeople from Boyacá Department
South American Games gold medalists for Colombia
South American Games medalists in athletics
Central American and Caribbean Games gold medalists for Colombia
Competitors at the 1998 South American Games
Competitors at the 1993 Central American and Caribbean Games
Central American and Caribbean Games medalists in athletics
Medalists at the 1983 Pan American Games
Medalists at the 1987 Pan American Games